Vigneswaran s/o Sanasee (born 16 December 1965) is a Malaysian politician who has served as Special Envoy of the Prime Minister to South Asia since November 2021 and 10th President of the Malaysian Indian Congress (MIC) since July 2018, a component party of the Barisan Nasional (BN) coalition.  He also served as 17th President of the Dewan Negara from April 2016 to June 2020, Senator from June 2014 to June 2020 and Member of Parliament (MP)  for Kota Raja from March 2004 to March 2008.  

Vigneswaran is the son of the late Sanyasi, JP, a former MIC parliament member in the 1980s. His cousin, Sellathevan, is a former MIC Youth leader and a Member of Parliament in 90's. His family has business interests in the Port Klang area.

Vigneswaran contested and won the 2004 general election to become Member of Parliament for Kota Raja parliamentary seat from 2004 to 2008. He lost and failed to retain the seat in the 2008 general election.

Controversies
Vigneswaran was alleged to have violated the dress code by wearing sandals and to have breached the security regulations by encroaching into the VIP lobby area before heading to the departure gates to send off his daughter to Britain without going through proper security check and without a security pass at the Kuala Lumpur International Airport (KLIA) on 14 November 2018. Transport Minister Anthony Loke Siew Fook had showed a CCTV footage of the incident and told Vigneswaran to apologise for it during a press conference on 17 November 2018. Vigneswaran denies he breached KLIA security protocols and claims that he wore sandals as he had wound on his foot. Police will investigate the incident as the airport management had filed a police report.

Election results

Honours

Honours of Malaysia
  : 
  Commander of the Order of Loyalty to the Crown of Malaysia (PSM) – Tan Sri (2017)
  :
  Companion Class II of the Exalted Order of Malacca (DPSM) – Datuk (2013)
  :
  Grand Knight of the Order of Sultan Ahmad Shah of Pahang (SSAP) – Dato' Sri (2015)

See also
List of people who have served in both Houses of the Malaysian Parliament

References 

Living people
1965 births
Malaysian Hindus
Malaysian people of Tamil descent
Malaysian politicians of Indian descent
Presidents of Malaysian Indian Congress
Presidents of the Dewan Negara
Members of the Dewan Negara
Members of the Dewan Rakyat
Commanders of the Order of Loyalty to the Crown of Malaysia
21st-century Malaysian politicians
University of Malaya alumni